Ideel,  formerly ideeli, is a flash sale based online retailer based in New York City.

History and Operations
Founded in 2006, its $77M in revenue in 2010 led Inc. to rank it as the fastest growing company in the United States for 2011.  In August 2012, Ideeli moved from Soho to the 45th floor of the New York Times Building. It has raised $70M in venture capital funding.

Ideel's business model is based on acquiring excess or sample merchandise and selling it quickly at very steep discounts to their members.  Sales typically last less than 48 hours.  In 2014 they rebranded themselves as a source for affordable designer clothing.

In January 2014, Groupon bought Ideel for $43 million.  At some point the name became ideel, dropping the final 'i'.

References 

Online retailers of the United States
Retail companies established in 2006
Internet properties established in 2006
2014 mergers and acquisitions